Hatín is a municipality and village in Jindřichův Hradec District in the South Bohemian Region of the Czech Republic. It has about 200 inhabitants.

Administrative parts
Villages of Jemčina and Stajka are administrative parts of Hatín.

References

Villages in Jindřichův Hradec District